Didak is a Slavic surname and given name. Notable people with the name include:

Didak Buntić (1871–1922), Franciscan friar and educator from Bosnia and Herzegovina
Alan Didak (born 1983), Australian rules footballer of Croatian descent 

Slavic-language surnames